Formula Masters Russia (formerly known as Formula Russia) - is a single-seater racing series based in Russia. The series was created in 2011 as an analogue of Formula Abarth.

The primary goal of the project is to find most talented young pilots and to prepare them for their big future in Formula One. Each pilot (or team) is provided with engineers and mechanics. All teams use Tatuus FA010 chassis.

Main conditions and benefits 
 Organizers help pilots in finding their sponsors
 Commercial organizations can create their own teams
 Each pilot discusses settings of his or her car with team engineer
 A single stock of spare parts
 A single supplier of tires
 A single supplier of petrol, oil and lubricants

Results 
All drivers were Russian-registered.

The format of the competition 

 8 events per year with 3 races in each.

Format of events 
  Friday  — free training (4 trainings, 30 minutes each, or 6 trainings, 20 minutes each);
  Saturday  — last training (20 minutes), first qualification (15 minutes) и first race (28 minutes + 1 lap);
  Sunday  — warming up (10 minutes), second qualification (15 minutes), second race (28 minutes + 1 lap), third race (28 minutes + 1 lap)
The place on the starting grid in first race depends on results of first qualification, the place on the starting grid in second race depends on results of second qualification, the place on the starting grid in third race depends on results of second race, with 6-8 positions inverted.

Main characteristics of Formula Masters Russia cars 

 Chassis 
Tatuus FA010 Carbon composite monocoque FIA F3-2010 safety homologated.

 Engine 
FPT 414TF, volume 1400 sm3, turbo,
200 h.p.,
torque: ~ 250 Nm
with 3500 turnovers per minute.

 Gearbox 
Sadev sequential six-speed gearbox — LSD differential.

 Brake Discs 
АР four-piston calipers, ventilated discs
brake pads FERODO.

 Fuel 
PREMIER FIA FT3, 45 lt.

 Wheel Rims 
ATS, Front 9x13", Rear 10,5x13"centre-bolt aluminium.

 Tires 
Front 180/550R13, Rear 240/570R13.

 Dimensions 
2650mm x 1490mm x 1455mm

 Weight 
525kg, including driver.

External links
 

Recurring sporting events established in 2011
Formula racing series
One-make series